Samuel Lewis Southard (June 9, 1787June 26, 1842) was a prominent American statesman of the early 19th century, serving as a U.S. Senator, Secretary of the Navy, and the tenth governor of New Jersey. He also served as President pro tempore of the Senate, and was briefly first in the presidential line of succession.

History

The son of Henry Southard and Sarah (Lewis) Southard, was born in the Basking Ridge section of Bernards Township, New Jersey, on June 9, 1787. Southard's ancestors included Anthony Janszoon van Salee, one of the earliest settlers of New Amsterdam, and his siblings included Isaac Southard. Southard attended the Brick Academy classical school and graduated from Princeton University in 1804.

Early career

After teaching school in New Jersey, he worked for several years as a tutor in the  Virginia home of John Taliaferro, his father's Congressional colleague. While living in Virginia, Southard studied law with Francis T. Brooke and Judge Williams, both of Fredericksburg. Upon being admitted to the bar, he returned to New Jersey, where he was appointed law reporter by the New Jersey Legislature in 1814. Elected to the New Jersey General Assembly in 1815, Southard was appointed to the New Jersey Supreme Court to succeed Mahlon Dickerson shortly thereafter, and in 1820 served as a presidential elector. He was elected to a seat in the United States Senate over James J. Wilson, and was appointed to the remainder of Wilson's term After Wilson resigned.  Southard served in office from January 26, 1821, to March 3, 1823, when he resigned. During this time, he was a member of the committee that produced the Missouri Compromise.

Navy career

President James Monroe selected Senator Southard to be Secretary of the Navy in September 1823, and he remained in office under President John Quincy Adams. During these years, he also served briefly as ad interim Secretary of the Treasury (1825) and Secretary of War (1828). Southard proved to be one of the most effective of the Navy's early Secretaries. He endeavored to enlarge the Navy and improve its administration, purchased land for the first Naval Hospitals, began construction of the first Navy dry docks, undertook surveys of U.S. coastal waters and promoted exploration in the Pacific Ocean. Responding to actions by influential officers, including David Porter, he reinforced the American tradition of civilian control over the military establishment. Also on Southard's watch, the Navy grew by some 50% in personnel and expenditures and expanded its reach into waters that had not previously seen an American man-of-war.

Political life
In 1829 Southard became New Jersey Attorney General, succeeding Theodore Frelinghuysen. In 1832, the state legislature elected him Governor over Peter D. Vroom by a vote of 40 to 24. In 1833, he was again elected to the U.S. Senate. During the next decade, he was a leader of the Whig Party and attained national prominence as chairman of the Committee on Naval Affairs. As President pro tempore of the Senate, he was first in the presidential line of succession after the death of William Henry Harrison and the accession of Vice President John Tyler to the presidency.

Failing health forced Southard to resign from the Senate in 1842. He died in Fredericksburg, Virginia, on June 26, 1842. Southard was buried in Washington's Congressional Cemetery.

Societies

During the 1820s, Southard was a member of the prestigious society, Columbian Institute for the Promotion of Arts and Sciences, who counted among their members former presidents Andrew Jackson and John Quincy Adams and many prominent men of the day, including well-known representatives of the military, government service, medical and other professions. In 1839, he was elected to the American Philosophical Society.

Legacy

The destroyer , (later DMS-10), 1919–1946, was named in his honor.
There is also a public park in Basking Ridge, New Jersey, named after him.

See also 
 List of United States Congress members who died in office (1790–1899)

References

Sources

Dictionary of American Biography.
Birkner, Michael. Samuel L. Southard: Jeffersonian Whig. Rutherford, N.J.: Fairleigh Dickinson University Press, 1984.
Ershkowitz, Herbert. Samuel L. Southard: A Case Study of Whig Leadership in the Age of Jackson. New Jersey History 88 (Spring 1970): 5-24.
Samuel L. Southard Papers (1783-1893),(bulk 1802-1846), Finding Aid C0250, consisting of 170 boxes and 73.6 lineal feet of original documents of financial and personal affairs, including correspondence from Charles Muir Campbell of Princeton, NJ.  Most boxes are organized by year and subject.  Access to these documents is Princeton University Library, Department of Rare Books and Special Collections, Manuscripts Division.

External links

New Jersey Governor Samuel Lewis Southard, National Governors Association
Samuel Lewis Southard at The Political Graveyard

|-

|-

|-

|-

|-

|-

1787 births
1842 deaths
People from Bernards Township, New Jersey
American people of Dutch descent
American Presbyterians
United States Secretaries of the Navy
Monroe administration cabinet members
John Quincy Adams administration cabinet members
Democratic-Republican Party United States senators from New Jersey
National Republican Party United States senators from New Jersey
Whig Party United States senators from New Jersey
New Jersey Democratic-Republicans
New Jersey National Republicans
New Jersey Whigs
Presidents pro tempore of the United States Senate
Governors of New Jersey
National Republican Party state governors of the United States
New Jersey Attorneys General
Members of the New Jersey General Assembly
Justices of the Supreme Court of New Jersey
Politicians from Fredericksburg, Virginia
Politicians from Somerset County, New Jersey
Princeton University alumni
Burials at the Congressional Cemetery
19th-century American lawyers
19th-century American politicians